Shinrone is a village in County Offaly, Ireland. It is in the southernmost part of the county, close to the border with County Tipperary. It lies at the junction of the R491 regional road between Nenagh and Roscrea with the R492 to Sharavogue. At the 2016 census, the village population was 645.

Sport

The local GAA team of the village is Shinrone GAA. The club is concerned with the game of hurling. The clubs playing colours are Red and White. Their playing field is St. Mary's Park, in the centre of the village. Shinrone have always had a strong association with providing Inter-County hurlers with Offaly. The current Offaly Senior Hurling Captain Jason Sampson is from Shinrone

Clubs neighbouring Shinrone include Ballyskenagh GAA, Coolderry GAA, also Kilruane MacDonagh's GAA and Knockshegowna GAA over the border in county Tipperary  

The local soccer club is Shinrone UTD FC. The team plays in the North Tipperary soccer league. There is also a ladies football club in the village.

Shinrone has a strong connection with Hunting. The Ormond Hunt takes place near Shinrone and gathers large crowds

Architecture
A number of buildings of architectural interest in and around Shinrone are listed on the National Inventory of Architectural Heritage website, including:

Cangort Castle - destroyed by Cromwellian forces in the 17th century. A gatehouse building remains.
Annaghbrook House (c. 1720) Previously derelict house with some features of architectural merit being renovated.
Tierney's, Main St. (c. 1750, renovated c. 1860) Two-storey house with pub. Steeply pitched roof with terracotta ridge tiles.
Bridge over a tributary of the Little Brosna River, Main St (c. 1820) Double arch bridge. Eastern arch has been converted to a pedestrian underpass.
St Mary's Church of Ireland (1821) Commissioned by the Board of First Fruits this church has a wider nave than usual.
Shinrone Roman Catholic Church (c. 1860, renovated c. 1980) T-plan church with cross finials on gables.

Transport
Local Link Tipperary operates a bus service between Roscrea railway station and Nenagh which stops at Shinrone Post Office. The service operates daily.

The nearest train stations to Shinrone are at Roscrea and Cloughjordan, both on the Limerick–Ballybrophy railway line.

In fiction
Shinrone is named in the Pogues song Broad Majestic Shannon.

Arlo Guthrie's visit to Shinrone is mentioned in Tim Winton's novel The Riders - shortlisted for the Booker Prize in 1995. A character in the novel overhears locals in the small Irish village of Shinrone, recount the night Arlo Guthrie came to play. The actual event occurred in February 1988, when Arlo played the local hall in Shinrone.

In media
Shinrone appeared in the titles of the satirical RTÉ television series Hall's Pictorial Weekly on 12 March 1980.

People
American President  Barack Obama's earliest known relative, Joseph Kearney, whose family subsequently moved to Moneygall and who would become the President's 7th great-grandfather, was from Shinrone where the Kearney family lived and died for four generations. Research from Trinity college shows this to be the President's earliest known relative.

Irish-born soldier, physician, and politician Edward Hand was born in Clyduff, King's County (now County Offaly) on 31 December 1744 and baptised in Shinrone. Hand served in the Continental Army during the American Revolutionary War, rising to the rank of Major-General, and later was a member of several Pennsylvania governmental bodies.

Education
There are two primary Schools located in the Parish. Shinrone National School, which is in the village, and Clonlisk National School, located outside the village.

Pupils from Shinrone usually attend Secondary School in either St Brendan's Community School in Birr, Colaiste Pobal Ros Cre, or Borrisokane Vocational School. The village is also very close to the Cistercian College, Roscrea, with some students attending.

References

Towns and villages in County Offaly